Beuxes is a commune in the Vienne department, region of Nouvelle-Aquitaine, western France.

Its inhabitants are called Beuxois.

Demographics

See also
Communes of the Vienne department

References

Communes of Vienne